Villa Alegre may refer to:

 Villa Alegre, Chile, a commune in Chile
 Villa Alegre (TV series)